The Historic Elitch Theatre is located at the original Elitch Gardens site in northwest Denver, Colorado.  Opened in 1890, it was centerpiece of the park that was the first zoo west of Chicago.  The theatre was Denver's first professional theatre, serving as home to America's first and oldest summer-stock theatre company from 1893 until the 1960s.  The first films in the western US were shown there in 1896.  Cecil B. DeMille sent yearly telegrams wishing the theatre another successful season, calling it "one of the cradles of American drama."

History
John Elitch and Mary Elitch Long first opened Elitch Gardens on May 1, 1890, with animals, bands, flowers and an open-air theatre where Mayor Londoner of Denver spoke.  Inspired by Shakespeare's Globe Theatre, the first shows were vaudeville acts by accomplished local and national performers.  In 1891 the theatre was enclosed and rebuilt for $100,000.  The Boston Opera Company performed musicals, and light opera starting with The Pirates of Penzance. In 1893 the first summer stock theatre company, the Norcross Company, was organized in the East and brought to the gardens.  Vaudeville shows continued until 1900.

In 1896, Edison's Vitascope was exhibited at the theatre showing the first films in Colorado.

The Elitch Gardens Stock Theatre Company began performing in 1897 under the management of Mary Elitch Long.  Its first season in 1897 opened with leading man James O'Neill, who had promised John that he would act in the new theatre when it was ready. The first show performed there was Helene.  The company became known for putting on ten plays in a ten-week summer season and attracting internationally known stars of the theatre and screen.

Sarah Bernhardt came to Denver in 1906 after the San Francisco earthquake destroyed the California Theatre where she was scheduled to perform. At Elitch's she played Camille at the matinée and LaSorcier at night. Douglas Fairbanks was hired into the same company.  Prior in 1905, he was hired to sweep the stage for theatre tickets.

Operating the park became too costly for Mary Elitch. With the purchase of Elitch Gardens by John Mulvihill in 1916, she relinquished control of the Gardens and theatre. (Two theatre boxes were always reserved for her and her friends).  Mulvihill oversaw the theatre until his death in 1930 and was succeeded by his son-in-law Arnold Gurtler.

In 1953, the Elitch Theatre was used to film scenes for The Glenn Miller Story.

The Elitch Garden Theatre Company became its own incorporated business, separate from the Elitch Gardens Park, renting the theatre in 1963.  The company stopped operating as a traditional resident summer-stock, switching to single, star-packaged shows from New York.  The company had many successful years, but as time and culture changed the theatre building was neglected.

The park's Trocadero Ballroom was bulldozed in 1975.  Fearing a similar fate, the community added the theatre to the National Register of Historic Places in 1976.

The Elitch Theatre Company's last season was in 1987.  The park booked the "Incredible Acrobats of China" for a season, then one night musical acts before it was officially closed in 1991.  The Robber Bridegroom was performed with Patrick Cassidy for the theatre's centennial anniversary.  Actor Raymond Burr raised $2 million for an educational program at the theatre.  The money was instead donated to local Cole Middle School.

The Elitch Gardens amusement park moved to the current central Platte Valley location in 1994.  The new $94 million park was opened in 1995 with attendance reaching one million.  Two fires in 1995 on the old Gardens property near the theatre cause public outcry for additional security.  The original Elitch property was sold to Perry Rose LLC in 1996 with the conditions that the theatre and carousel shell never be demolished.

In 2011, Barbara Medill, a friend of Mary Elitch Long, donated some of Long's possessions to the Foundation, including an engraved silver table setting.  Around the same time, the hand-painted decorative historic "Anne Hathaway" curtain, (oil on canvas: circa early 1900s), was removed from its original wooden bats and stored for construction work.  After years of neglect and severe water damage the curtain was rolled and stored in a backstage room at the theatre.

After a massive volunteer cleanup, the interior was opened for Doors Open Denver in April 2012.  Musicians and Shakespearean performers were the first acts on stage in the 22 years since the building closed.

In 2016, Curtains Without Borders (a non-profit organization promulgating proper storage etiquette of antiquated theatre curtains and drapes.) Representatives from the group gave a lecture at the Elitch Theatre about theatre grand drapes and curtains. They were asked to review the Elitch Theatre's "Anne Hathaway" grand drape and consult on its restoration.  The drape was removed from storage, and unrolled by CWB representatives and theatre volunteers who discovered improper storage. The drape was illegible, and the paint dissolved into dust as the curtain was unrolled.  The curtain was displayed on the backstage theatre floor for lecture attendees to view. Those who regarding it as a piece of Colorado history were devastated that it had been destroyed by time and  neglect.

In 2018 the outdoor films and summer children's programming at the theater were cancelled due to $800,000 in damages caused by wind and a hail storm.

Restoration
The theatre closed in 1991 and sat empty for the next 11 years.A nonprofit organization, the Historic Elitch Gardens Theatre Foundation, was formed in 2002 to raise funds, maintain, preserve and restore the theatre and carousel pavilion.  In 2006, the Historic Elitch Gardens Theatre Foundation received $5 million in federal, state, and city funding, plus grants and private donations. Work began on phase 1 -- saving and restoring the historic exterior.  The groundbreaking for the renovation of the theatre began with restoring the building's exterior, including a concrete foundation under the exterior walls. The roof, gable, main entrance/lobby, and exterior walls were replaced and painted.A section of dressing rooms and shops on the West side of the building was demolished. Exterior restoration on the historic auditorium was completed in 2007.

Phase 2 of the restoration (2013-2014) included various health and safety upgrades, including restoring electricity and lighting throughout the building and the addition of a fire suppression system.  This upgrade allowed the theatre to get temporary occupancy and begin tours and limited events.

With the completion of Phase 3 (2020-2021) restrooms were added, a new roof was put on, and various other upgrades were made, allowing for the theatre to gain permanent occupancy. 

Fundraising continues for interior renovations, including the need for theatre rigging, lighting, sound, etc. The vision is to reopen as a multimedia performing arts complex for the community offering education, film, live music, and theatre.

Stars Who Appeared at The Elitch Theatre

Steve Allen, 1974
Morey Amsterdam, 1968
Eve Arden, 1965
Cliff Arquette, 1966
George Arliss, 1905–06, '13
John Astin, 1973–74
Sarah Bernhardt, 1906
Beulah Bondi, 1925–26
Shirley Booth, 1968
Helen Bonfils, 1934–59
Joe E. Brown, 1963
Raymond Burr, 1944
Sid Caesar, 1971, '74
Kitty Carlisle, 1965, '70
Jon Cypher, 1958
Cecil B. DeMille, 1905
Brandon deWilde, 1972 ***
Patty Duke, 1973–74
Douglas Fairbanks, 1905
Douglas Fairbanks Jr., 1971–73
Maude Fealy, 1896, 1903, 1904, 1907, 1909, 1917
Jose Ferrer, 1973
Minnie Maddern Fiske 1905, 1907–08
Arlene Francis, 1964–65, '69
Mitzi Gaynor, 1987
Barbara Bel Geddes, 1964
George Gobel, 1971
Karen Grassle, 1972
Julie Harris, 1978
Mimi Hines, 1965, 1968, 1970
Kim Hunter, 1975
Gabe Kaplan, 1982–83
Grace Kelly, 1951
Cloris Leachman, 1982–83
Harold Lloyd, 1914
Myrna Loy, 1969
Fredric March, 1926–28
Enid Markey, 1942
Jayne Meadows, 1974
Patricia Neal, 1947
Maureen O'Sullivan, 1972, '82-83
Walter Pidgeon, 1964
Antoinette Perry, 1904–05
Howard Platt, 1968, 1984
Jane Powell, 1981
Tyrone Power, 1905
Vincent Price, 1979
Rosemary Prinz, 1968, 1977
John Raitt, 1977, '79
Robert Redford, 1955
Lynn Redgrave, 1975
Debbie Reynolds 1986
Edward G. Robinson, 1922
Ginger Rogers, 1975
Cesar Romero, 1964
Mickey Rooney, 1972–74
William Shatner, 1975, 1980
Stephen Stills, 1991
Haila Stoddard, 1953, 1975, 1983
Gloria Swanson, 1967
Constance Towers, 1969
Ernest Truex, 1903, 1904, 1906
Lana Turner, 1977
Joan Van Ark, 1960
Dick Van Patten, 1968
Helen Ware, 1912
Nancy Walker, 1987
Blanche Walsh, 1901
David Warfield, 1908
Paxton Whitehead, 1979
Shelley Winters, 1973, '83
Donald Woods (actor), 1933-32, 1939, 1941, 1947–48
Jane Wyatt, 1939

*** Brandon deWilde died in motor vehicle accident in Lakewood, Colorado, days after his final performance at the theatre.

Gallery

References

External links

Historic Elitch Garden Theatre Foundation 
Elitch Gardens Official Site
A Word on the Elitch Theatre featurette
Historic Elitch Gardens Theatre 2010 Video
Elitch's Comeback Performance, 2012 story on Colorado Public Radio
Curtains Without Boarders
Perry Rose LLC

Cinemas and movie theaters in Colorado
Music venues in Colorado
Theatres in Denver
Former theatres in the United States
History of Denver
National Register of Historic Places in Denver
Theatres on the National Register of Historic Places in Colorado
Stick-Eastlake architecture in the United States
Shingle Style architecture in Colorado